Philippe Rousselot,  (born 4 September 1945) is a French cinematographer and film director best known for his wide range of work in both European and mainstream American cinema, ranging in genres from drama, to fantasy, to blockbusters. He has collaborated with directors such as Robert Redford, Neil Jordan, Stephen Frears, Tim Burton, David Yates, and Guy Ritchie. He is the recipient of three César Awards, a BAFTA, an Oscar, and is a nominee for the Palme d'Or.

Life and career 
Rousselot was born in Briey, Meurthe-et-Moselle, France. After studying cinema at l'École Louis Lumière, he graduated in 1966 with, among others, François About, Eduardo Serra, Noël Very, and Jean-François Robin. He began as an assistant to Néstor Almendros, then quickly emerged as chief operator, leading to his career. He collaborated, in particular, with Jean-Jacques Beineix (Diva), Alain Cavalier (Thérèse), Jean-Jacques Annaud (The Bear), Robert Redford (A River Runs Through It), Stephen Frears (Dangerous Liaisons), John Boorman (The Tailor of Panama), Patrice Chéreau (Queen Margot), Bertrand Blier (Thanks Life), Neil Jordan (Interview with the Vampire), and Tim Burton on Planet of the Apes, Big Fish, and Charlie and the Chocolate Factory.

For Henry & June, he was nominated the Academy Award for Best Cinematography in 1990. He won the 1992 Academy Award for Best Cinematography for his work on A River Runs Through It, and earned three César Awards for Best Cinematography, in 1982 for Diva, in 1987 for Thérèse and in 1995 for Queen Margot.

Style 
With director Jean-Jaques Beineix and Diva, he worked successfully to make photographic aesthetics a central element of the filming process, developing a photographic light "effect" and creating a timeless, almost unreal atmosphere, which would become his trademark as in the films of Bertrand Blier. He tried to achieve this effect in 1997 with The Serpent's Kiss.

Filmography

Awards

Academy Awards

BAFTA Awards

American Society of Cinematographers

César Award

British Society of Cinematographers

National Society of Film Critics

Cannes Film Festival

Other awards

References

External links

 Philippe Rousselot on the AFC site

1945 births
Living people
People from Briey
French cinematographers
Best Cinematographer Academy Award winners
Best Cinematography BAFTA Award winners
César Award winners